Dice are polyhedral objects used in games for generating random numbers.

Dice, DICE, or dicing may also refer to:

Fiction
 Dice (G.I. Joe), a fictional ninja in the G.I. Joe universe
 Dice Living, a way of life depicted in the novel The Dice Man by Luke Rhinehart
 King Dice, a character from the video game Cuphead
 Dice Block, an item in Mario Party to determine the character's movement on the gameboard

Music
 Dice (album), a 1989 comedy album by Andrew Dice Clay
 "Dice" (Flow song), 2021
 "Dice" (hide song), 1994
 "Dice" (Finley Quaye song), 2004
 "Dice" (Onew song), 2022
 "Dice" (Nmixx song), 2022 song by Nmixx
 Dice (EP), 2022 EP by Onew
 "Dice", a song by Band-Maid on their album World Domination
 "Dices", the Spanish version of Selena Gomez & the Scene's 2010 single, "Who Says (Selena Gomez & the Scene song)"

People
 Dice (rapper), American rapper
 Andrew Dice Clay (born 1957), American comedian
 Lee R. Dice (1887–1977), American ecologist and geneticist
 Tom Dice (born 1989), Belgian singer

Science and technology
 DICE (compiler), a C compiler for Amiga
 DICE (DEA database), a DEA database, consists largely of phone log and Internet data
 Dice (programming language), an object-oriented programming language
 DICE (ticketing company), a live music discovery and ticketing company
 DICE model (Dynamic Integrated Climate-Economy model), a computer model of climate change
 Diceware, a method used for generating security phrases
 Dice's coefficient, a similarity measure used in information retrieval
 Dice.com, a career website 
 Dual Interlocked storage CEll, an implementation of a radiation-hardened memory cell; see KOMDIV-32
 Dynamic Intelligent Currency Encryption, an AI-controlled security technology for banknote and asset systems
 Wafer dicing, a step in semiconductor processing where device chips are cut out of a wafer

Television
 Dice (TV miniseries), a live-action television miniseries
 Dice (TV series), a 2016 television sitcom
 Dice: Undisputed, a 2007 American TV reality show
 D.I.C.E., a 2005 animated television series

Video games 
 DICE (company), formally known as EA Digital Illusions CE, a Swedish video game developer
 D.I.C.E. Summit, an annual gathering of executives from the video game industry
 D.I.C.E. Awards, an annual video game awards show

Other uses
 Dice (horse) (1925–1927), an American Champion Thoroughbred racehorse
 Dice, Kentucky, an unincorporated community in Perry County, Kentucky, US
 Defense-Independent Component ERA, a baseball statistic
 Dicing, a method of preparing food chopping it into small cubes or dice
 Durrell Institute of Conservation and Ecology in the United Kingdom

See also
 Die (disambiguation)